Muhammad Quli Musavi Khan Kintoori  (1775-1844), (Hindi: अयातोल्लाह सय्यिद मीर मुसावी किन्तूरी, Urdu: آيت‌الله سیید میر موسوی کنتوری ),  was principal Sadr Amin at the British court in Meerut. He was also author of Tathir al-mu'minin 'an najasat al-mushrikin.

Muḥammad Qulī was a son of Muḥammad Ḥusayn. He was popularly known as Mīr Muḥammad Qulī. He had three sons, Sayyid Sirāj Ḥusayn (1823–65), Sayyid Iʿjāz Ḥusayn (1825-1870) and Sayyid Ḥāmid Ḥusayn (1830-1888).

He wrote five books in refutation of different chapters of the Tuhfehye Ithna Ashariyyah of Shah Abdul Aziz Dehlawi:
 Al Sayf al Nasiri, on the first chapter 
 Taqlid al Mmaka'id, on the second chapter 
 Burhan al Sa`adah, on the seventh chapter 
 Tashyid al Mmata'in li kashf al Ddagha'in, in two volumes on the tenth chapter
 Masari al Afham li qal al Awham.

See also
Islamic scholars

References

Indian Muslim scholars of Islam
People from Barabanki, Uttar Pradesh
Indian ayatollahs
Indian Shia Muslims
Abaqati family
1775 births
1844 deaths